WRPX-TV (channel 47) is a television station licensed to Rocky Mount, North Carolina, United States, broadcasting the Ion Television network to the Research Triangle region. It is owned and operated by the Ion Media subsidiary of the E. W. Scripps Company alongside Archer Lodge–licensed Bounce TV outlet WFPX-TV (channel 62). WRPX-TV and WFPX-TV share a sales office on Gresham Lake Road in Raleigh; through a channel sharing agreement, the two stations transmit using WRPX-TV's spectrum from a tower northeast of Middlesex, North Carolina.

WRPX's signal was previously relayed on WFPX; WRPX served the northern half of the market, including Raleigh, Durham and Chapel Hill, while WFPX served the southern part, including Fayetteville and Southern Pines.

Technical information

Subchannels
The station's digital signal is multiplexed:

Analog-to-digital conversion
WRPX-TV discontinued regular programming on its analog signal, over UHF channel 47, at noon on June 12, 2009, the official date in which full-power television stations in the United States transitioned from analog to digital broadcasts under federal mandate. The station's digital signal continued to broadcasts on its pre-transition UHF channel 15. Through the use of PSIP, digital television receivers display the station's virtual channel as its former UHF analog channel 47.

Spectrum repack
WRPX-TV moved from channel 15 to channel 32 on September 11, 2019.

Out-of-market coverage
In recent years, WRPX-TV has been carried on cable in multiple areas within the Greenville and Wilmington media markets.

References

External links

Ion Television affiliates
Court TV affiliates
Ion Mystery affiliates
Defy TV affiliates
TrueReal affiliates
Scripps News affiliates
E. W. Scripps Company television stations
Television channels and stations established in 1992
RPX-TV
1992 establishments in North Carolina
Rocky Mount, North Carolina